Chris Fleming (born March 3, 1970) is an American professional basketball coach who is currently an assistant coach for the Chicago Bulls of the National Basketball Association (NBA). He was also a professional basketball player, who spent his whole pro playing career with the German 2nd Division club QTSV.

Playing career

College
Fleming grew up in Long Beach Island, New Jersey, before moving to Forked River, New Jersey with his family, when he was ten years of age. After playing high school basketball at Lacey Township High School, Fleming played college basketball at the University of Richmond, with the Richmond Spiders.

Professional
Fleming played professional basketball from 1994 to 2000, with the German 2nd Division club QTSV, based in the city of Quakenbrück. That is where he met his wife Anne.

Coaching career
Fleming began his coaching career as an assistant basketball coach with QTSV in 1998. In 2000, he became the head coach of QTSV and remained in that job until 2008. He guided the Quakenbrück-based team to promotion to the German top-flight level Basketball-Bundesliga, and to a German Cup title in 2008. He then became the head coach of Brose Bamberg in 2008. In October 2012, he extended his contract with Brose Baskets through 2016. However, in May 2014, Fleming parted ways with the club. Under Fleming's guidance, Bamberg captured four German championships and three German Cup titles. Fleming also received Bundesliga Coach of the Year honors in 2011.

Fleming was a member of the coaching staff of the San Antonio Spurs at the 2014 NBA Summer League. In November 2014, he was appointed the new coach of the senior German national basketball team, by the German Basketball Federation. In July 2015, Fleming was named an assistant coach of the Denver Nuggets. On July 5, 2016, Fleming was named an assistant coach of the Brooklyn Nets. His last game as head coach of the German national team was a 72–84 loss to Spain in the quarterfinals of the 2017 European Championships. He had opted to focus solely on his job as assistant coach at the Brooklyn Nets.

In May 2019, the Chicago Bulls, under head coach Jim Boylen, hired Fleming as the lead assistant coach. Fleming was retained by new head coach Billy Donovan prior to the 2020-21 NBA season. On December 24, 2021, he was named as the Bulls' interim head coach as Donovan entered NBA's COVID-19 protocol. The Bulls went 5–0 with Fleming as acting head coach.

Awards and accomplishments

Coaching career
4x German Cup Winner: (2008, 2010, 2011, 2012)
4x German League Champion: (2010, 2011, 2012, 2013)
3x German Supercup Winner: (2010, 2011, 2012)
German League Coach of the Year: (2011)

References

External links
Euroleague.net Coaching Profile
FIBA Europe Coaching Profile

1970 births
Living people
American expatriate basketball people in Germany
American men's basketball coaches
American men's basketball players
Artland Dragons coaches
Artland Dragons players
Basketball coaches from New Jersey
Basketball players from New Jersey
Brooklyn Nets assistant coaches
Brose Baskets coaches
Chicago Bulls assistant coaches
Denver Nuggets assistant coaches
Lacey Township High School alumni
Point guards
Richmond Spiders men's basketball players
Shooting guards
Sportspeople from Lacey Township, New Jersey